Chinese Taipei competed at the 2018 Asian Games in Jakarta and Palembang, Indonesia, from 18 August to 2 September 2018. At the last Games in Incheon, the country bagged a total 51 medals, including 10 gold, 18 silver, and 23 bronze. This time, Chinese Taipei is set to send a 738-strong team to compete in 36 of 40 sporting events, including 588 athletes.

Competitors 
The following is a list of the number of competitors representing Chinese Taipei that will participate at the Games:

Medalists

The following Chinese Taipei competitors won medals at the Games.

|  style="text-align:left; width:78%; vertical-align:top;"|

Main event 

|  style="text-align:left; width:22%; vertical-align:top;"|

|  style="text-align:left; width:78%; vertical-align:top;"|

Demonstration event 

|  style="text-align:left; width:22%; vertical-align:top;"|

Archery 

Recurve

Compound

Athletics

Road & track events 

Men's

Women's

Field events 

Men's

Women's

Combined 

Women

Badminton

Men

Women

Mixed

Baseball 

Summary

Roster
The following is the Chinese Taipei roster for the men's baseball tournament of the 2018 Asian Games.

Round 2 – Group B

Super Round

Bronze medal match

Basketball 

Summary

5×5 basketball
Chinese Taipei team entered the competition and drawn in the group C for the men's team, and in the group X for the women's team.

Men's tournament

Roster
The following is the Chinese Taipei roster in the men's basketball tournament of the 2018 Asian Games.

Group C

Quarterfinal

Semifinal

Bronze medal match

Women's tournament

Roster
The following is the Chinese Taipei roster in the women's basketball tournament of the 2018 Asian Games.

Group X

Quarterfinal

Semifinal

Bronze medal match

3×3 basketball 
Chinese Taipei national 3x3 team will participate in the Games. The men's and women's team placed in pool B respectively based on the FIBA 3x3 federation ranking.

Men's tournament

Roster
Chien You-che
Chou Wei-chen
Chu Yun-hao
Tseng Hsiang-chun

Pool B

Quarter-final

Women's tournament

Roster
Lin Tieh
Lo Pei-chen
Peng Hsiao-tong
Wang Jing-ting

Pool B

Quarter-final

Semifinal

Bronze medal game

Bowling

Trios

Team of six

Masters

Boxing

Men

Women

Canoeing

Slalom

Sprint

Traditional boat race

Contract bridge

Men

Women

Mixed

Supermixed

Cycling

Mountain biking

Road cycling

Track

Men

Women

Equestrian 

Dressage

Jumping

 – indicates that the score of this rider does not count in the team competition, since only the best three results of a team are counted. Wong I-shoau (Zadarijke V) qualified to the final round B but was replaced by Hsieh Ping-yang (Just Energie).

Fencing 

Individual

Team

Field hockey 

Chinese Taipei entered the women's national field hockey team that competed at the Games.

Summary

Women's tournament 

Roster

Pool A

Seventh place game

Football 

Chinese Taipei men's and women's team were drawn in the group A at the Games respectively.

Summary

Men's tournament 

Roster

Group A

Women's tournament 

Roster

Group A

Quarterfinals

Semifinals

Bronze medal match

Golf

Gymnastics

Artistic

Team & individual qualifications 
Men

Women

Finals 
Men

Women

Handball 

Chinese Taipei will compete in group D at the men's team event.

Summary

Men's tournament

Roster

Lin You-ting
Liu-Tzu-fan
Huang Hsin-wei
Wang-Ta-kang
Chiu Yi-fan
Wu Hsiu-min
Lin Kun-ming
Lai Hung-sheng
Chen Yen-tung
Hsu Chih-kun
Pan En-chieh
Huang Chen-kang
Hsu Hsien-ming
Hsiao Nien-cheng
Chao Hsien-chang
Huang Chia-hua

Group D

Classification round

Judo

Men

Women

Mixed

Ju-jitsu

Men's

Kabaddi

Summary

Women's tournament

Team roster

Lin I-min
Lin Yu-fen
Chuang Ya-han
Huang Ssu-chin
Yen Chiao-wen
Chen Yung-ting
Hu Yu-chen
Feng Hsiu-chen
Qin Pei-jyun
Huang Yi-yun
Liao Yu-tzu
Wu Yu-jung

Group B

Semifinal

Karate

Kata

Kumite

Kurash

Men

Women

Paragliding

Men

Roller sports

Skateboarding

Speed skating

Rowing 

Men

Women

Rugby sevens 

Chinese Taipei rugby sevens men's team entered the group B at the Games.

Summary

Men's tournament 

Squad
The following is the Chinese Taipei squad in the men's rugby sevens tournament of the 2018 Asian Games.

Head coach: Chang Wei-cheng

Chang Lun-wei
Chang Hao-wei
Chen Chih-chieh
Hsieh Pin-yi
Huang Po-wei
Huang Te-lung
Lin Chueh-hao
Lo Hsin-kuei
Shen Ching-hung
Shen Ming-kuang
Sun Wei-chiang
Sung Che-yu

Group B

Quarterfinal

Classification semifinal (5–8)

7th place game

Sailing

Men

Sambo

Shooting 

Men

Women

Mixed team

Softball 

Summary

Roster

Chen Chia-yi
Chen Miao-yi
Chiu An-ju
Lai Meng-ting
Li Szu-shih
Lin Chih-ying
Lin Feng-chen
Lin Pei-chun
Lin Su-hua
Lin Ying-hsin
Liu Hsuan
Shih Ching-ping
Su Yi-hsuan
Tsai Chia-chen
Tu Ya-ting
Yang Yi-ting
Yen Yi

Preliminary round
The top four teams will advance to the Final round.

Semifinal

Bronze medal match

Final

Soft tennis

Men

Women

Mixed

Sport climbing 

Speed

Combined

Swimming

Men

Women

Mixed

Table tennis

Singles and doubles

Team

Taekwondo 

Poomsae

Kyorugi

Tennis 

Men

Women

Mixed

Triathlon 

Men

Women

Mixed

Volleyball 

Chinese Taipei Volleyball Association entered their athletes to compete in the beach and indoor volleyball competition.

Beach volleyball

Indoor volleyball

Men's tournament

Team roster
The following is the Chinese Taipei roster in the men's volleyball tournament of the 2018 Asian Games.

Head coach: Chen Yuan

Pool D

Quarterfinal

Semifinal

Bronze medal game

Women's tournament

Team roster
The following is the Taiwanese roster in the women's volleyball tournament of the 2018 Asian Games.

Head coach: Yao Cheng-shan

Pool B

9th place game

Weightlifting 

Men

Women

Wrestling 

Men

Women

Wushu 

Men's sanda

Men's taolu

Women's sanda

Women's taolu

Canoe polo 

Summary

eSports

See also
 Chinese Taipei at the 2018 Asian Para Games

References

Nations at the 2018 Asian Games
2018
Asian Games